A list of films produced in Argentina in 1943:

External links and references
 Argentine films of 1943 at the Internet Movie Database

1943
Films
Argentine